This is a list of bazaars and souqs.

Bazaars

Albania and Kosovo 

In Albania and Kosovo, two distinct types of bazaar can be found; Bedesten (also known as bezistan, bezisten, bedesten) which refers to a covered bazaar and an open bazaar.

Afghanistan

Australia 
 Ingleburn Bazaar (held annually during the Ingleburn Festival)

Azerbaijan

Bangladesh 

In Bangladesh, a Haat bazaar (also known as hat or haat or hatt) refers to a regular produce market, typically held once or twice per week.

Belarus 
 Slavianski Bazaar in Vitebsk

Bosnia and Herzegovina

China

Egypt 
 Khan el-Khalili, Cairo

Hong Kong

India 

In India, and also Pakistan, a town or city's main market is known as a Saddar Bazaar.

Border bazaars 
These are mutually agreed border bazaars and haats of India on borders of India with its neighbours.

Assam

Bangalore, Karnataka 
 Gandhi Bazaar, Bangalore

Chennai, Tamil Nadu

Delhi and NCR 
 In Delhi

 In National Capital Region (NCR)

Hyderabad, Telangana

Indore 
 Sarafa Bazaar, Indore, India

Jaipur, Rajasthan

Kerala, Keralam 
 Chala Bazaar, Thiruvananthapuram, Kerala
 Rice Bazaar Thrissur, Kerala

Kolkata, West Bengal

Mumbai, Maharashtra

Munger, Bihar 
 Bari Bazaar, Munger

Odisha

Punjab

Rajkot, Gujarat 
 Sadar Bazaar, Rajkot

Uttar Pradesh

Indonesia

Iran

Iraq 
A Qaysari Bazaar is a type of covered bazaar typical of Iraq.

Israel and Palestine

old city of nablus market
old city of hebron bazaar
old city market

Kazakhstan

Kuwait 
 Souq Almubarikiyya * Souq Avenues

Kyrgyzstan

Lebanon 
After sustaining irreparable damage during the country's civil war, Beirut's ancient souks have been completely modernised and rebuilt while maintaining the original ancient Greek street grid, major landmarks and street names.

Malaysia

Nepal

North Macedonia 
In the Balkans, the term, 'Bedesten' is used to describe a covered market or bazaar.
 Old Bazaar, Bitola
 Old Bazaar, Prilep
 Old Bazaar, Skopje

Norway 
 Oslo Bazaars – a protected site

Pakistan

Hyderabad, Pakistan

Karachi

Kashmir 

Boi Bazar-Kashmir-Point

Lahore

Peshawar 
 Qissa Khawani Bazaar, Peshawar

Punjab, Pakistan

Rajdhani 
 Gala Bazaar, Rajdhani

Sargodha

Serbia 
 New Bazar, Novi Pazar

South Africa 
 Marabastad, Pretoria also known as ''Asiatic Bazaar, Pretoria, South Africa

Sri Lanka 
 Madawala Bazaar

Syria

Tanzania 
 Darajani Market also known as Darajani Bazaar

Tunisia 
 Souks of Tunis

Turkey 
In Turkey, the term 'bazaars' is used in the English sense, to refer to a covered market place. In Turkish the term for bazaar is "çarşı."

Turkmenistan 
 Gulistan Bazaar, (also known as the Russian Bazaar) Ashgabat
 Altyn Asyr Bazaar, Ashgabat (formerly Tolkuchka bazaar)

Uzbekistan

List of souqs

Souks in Marrakesch Morocco
Souks of Tunis 
List of souqs in Dubai, UAE

References

 
 

Bazaar